The statue of Charles II stands in the Figure, or Middle, Court of the Royal Hospital, Chelsea, London. The sculptor was Grinling Gibbons, and the statue was executed around 1680–1682. The king founded the Royal Hospital in 1682 as a home for retired army veterans. The statue is a Grade I listed structure.

History 
Charles II founded the Royal Hospital in 1682 to care for "those broken by age or war". The inspiration was the Hôtel des Invalides in Paris, founded by Louis XIV of France. The commission was given to Christopher Wren and construction continued from 1682 to 1691. The statue of Charles was commissioned by Tobias Rustat, a member of the king's court and was designed by Grinling Gibbons in about 1682. Gibbons's fee was £500. The statue originally stood elsewhere and was moved to the Royal Hospital after Charles's death in 1685. Annually, on 29 May, Oak Apple Day, the traditional day for the celebration of the Restoration in 1660, the statue is wreathed with oak leaves.

Description 
The statue is of brass and was originally gilded in bronze. It has been re-gilded subsequently to commemorate the Golden Jubilee of Queen Elizabeth II in 2002. It depicts the king in the attire of a Roman general, is 7.6 ft high, and stands on a marble plinth. The statue was designated a Grade I listed structure, the highest grading given to buildings and structures of "exceptional interest", in 1969.

References

Bibliography

External links 
 

Bronze sculptures in the United Kingdom
Buildings and structures completed in 1682
Grade I listed buildings in the Royal Borough of Kensington and Chelsea
Grade I listed monuments and memorials
Monuments and memorials in London
Outdoor sculptures in London
Charles II, Chelsea